The Malinauskas ministry is the 74th and current ministry (cabinet) of the Government of South Australia, led by Peter Malinauskas of the South Australian Labor Party. It was formed after Labor's victory at the 2022 state election and succeeded the Marshall ministry.

The ministry is made up of 14 members of the Labor Party and 1 independent member Geoff Brock, who was previously also a minister at the Weatherill Labor ministry.

First formation
The ministry commenced on 21 March 2022, with Malinauskas, deputy party leader Susan Close and Stephen Mullighan sworn in as a three-member ministry. Malinauskas was sworn in to cover other ministerial portfolios on an acting basis until the rest of the ministry was announced and sworn in on 24 March 2022.

The ministry was evolved largely from Malinauskas' shadow ministry before the election. Nick Champion, Joe Szakacs and independent Geoff Brock were new additions to the frontbench, while Emily Bourke was appointed as an Assistant Minister instead and Lee Odenwalder was dropped from the frontbench completely.

The portfolios that Malinauskas held on an acting basis between 21 and 24 March 2022 are not listed below.

Assistant Ministers 
 Emily Bourke MLC, Assistant Minister to the Premier
 Rhiannon Pearce MP, Assistant Minister to the Deputy Premier

See also
 Shadow ministry of Peter Malinauskas

References

External links
 
 

South Australian ministries
Cabinets established in 2022
2022 establishments in Australia
Lists of current office-holders in Australia